Raja Rajendra Singh (29 February 1928 – 7 June 2010) was the Raja of Baghal from 1946 until 1971.

References 

1928 births
2010 deaths
Rajputs
Indian monarchs
People from Solan district